Cocoto Kart Racer is a kart-racing game released by Neko Entertainment between 2005 and 2009 on major platforms. The original Wii Edition was exclusive to North America and a "sequel" was released on Wii for PAL regions in 2011, but Cocoto Kart Racer 2 is just a revision of the first game branded as a sequel. The only difference is support for the Wii Wheel, aka tilting the Wii Remote to steer, whereas the original release required the Nunchuck.

Gameplay 
The game includes eight drivers and four secret drivers (though only 5 are featured on the case) each with their own handling.

The drivers are called Cocoto, Baggy, Turtini, Geckill, Scritch, Duggil, Shiny, & Neuro.

Release 
The game was first released in Europe in 2005 for the PS2 and GameCube. It was published by BigBen Interactive
The game was later published in 2007 by Midway Games in Europe, Kemco in Japan, and Conspiracy Entertainment in the US on the Nintendo DS. The Wii versions were published once again by BigBen and Conspiracy in 2008.

Consoles 
Cocoto Kart Racer was released for the Game Cube, PlayStation 2, Game Boy Advance, and finally DS. The Game Boy Advance and DS ports are different games.

References 

2005 video games
Android (operating system) games
GameCube games
IOS games
Kart racing video games
Nintendo DS games
PlayStation 2 games
Wii games
Windows games
Game Boy Advance games
Video games developed in France
Conspiracy Entertainment games
Multiplayer and single-player video games
Neko Entertainment games